The 1901–02 Sheffield Shield season was the tenth season of the Sheffield Shield, the domestic first-class cricket competition of Australia. New South Wales won the championship.

Table

Statistics

Most Runs
Clem Hill 264

Most Wickets
Arthur McBeath 20

References

Sheffield Shield
Sheffield Shield
Sheffield Shield seasons